The Los Angeles Community College District (LACCD) is the community college district serving Los Angeles, California, and some of its neighboring cities and certain unincorporated areas of Los Angeles County. Its headquarters are in Downtown Los Angeles. Over the past seventy-seven years LACCD has served as educator to more than three million students. In addition to typical college aged students, the LACCD also serves adults of all ages: over half of all LACCD students are older than 25 years of age, and more than a quarter are 35 or older. LACCD educates almost three times as many Latino students and nearly four times as many African-American students as all of the University of California campuses combined. Eighty percent of LACCD students are from underserved populations. The Los Angeles Community College District is the largest community college district in the United States and is one of the largest in the world. The nine colleges within the district offer educational opportunities to students in Los Angeles. It serves students located in the Alhambra, Beverly Hills, Burbank, Culver City, Garvey, Las Virgenes, Los Angeles, Montebello, Palos Verdes and San Gabriel school districts. The district covers the Los Angeles city limits, San Fernando, Calabasas, Agoura Hills, Hidden Hills, Burbank, West Hollywood, Beverly Hills, Culver City, Alhambra, Monterey Park, San Gabriel, Rosemead (southern portion), Montebello, Commerce, Vernon, Huntington Park, Bell, Cudahy, Bell Gardens, South Gate, Gardena, Carson, Lomita, Palos Verdes Estates, Rolling Hills, Rancho Palos Verdes, and numerous unincorporated communities, including East Los Angeles, Florence-Firestone, Athens, and Walnut Park.

Colleges

Board of trustees
The Los Angeles Community College District is governed by an elected Board of Trustees first established in 1969. The board generally meets twice a month.

References

External links

 

Schools accredited by the Western Association of Schools and Colleges